Polmadie is a primarily industrial area of Glasgow in Scotland. Situated south of the River Clyde, Polmadie is close to residential neighbourhoods including Govanhill (to the west) and Toryglen (south-east), with Oatlands and another large industrial zone at Shawfield to the north on the opposite side of major railway lines and the M74 motorway, Junction 1A of which serves the area.

For over 50 years, the most prominent landmarks within Polmadie were the  twin chimneys of a now disused waste incinerator plant operated by Glasgow City Council. This was replaced by a 'Recycling and Renewable Energy Centre' on the same site operated by Viridor with a less conspicuous stack.
 
Also located in the area is Alstom's Polmadie Depot, a large railway maintenance facility for Avanti West Coast which is the most northerly train stabling and maintenance area on the West Coast Main Line (WCML), since the line runs through Polmadie on its final approach into Glasgow Central station.

The area was also home to BOC's industrial gases filling plant and main Scottish base, until this moved to a more modern facility in early 2007 in Cambuslang just outside Glasgow in anticipation of the completion of the M74 Southern link and associated redevelopment of the surrounding area.

History

Origin and meaning of the name

Polmadie is derived from the Scottish Gaelic Poll Mac Dè. Most place-names of the neighbourhoods of Glasgow were either coined by Gaelic-speakers or adapted to Gaelic from Cumbric. Polmadie is an early Gaelic name, containing the Gaelic "poll" (pool), but which usually means burn or stream in areas where Gaelic replaced Cumbric. From a late 12th century form, Polmacde, it is clear that the middle element is Gaelic mac (of (the) sons). The third element could be either the personal name Daigh, or the Gaelic Dè (of God), referring to an early religious establishment beside the burn. A remarkable feature of this place-name is how the original stress-pattern has survived, even centuries after its meaning ceased to be understood by those using it locally. It is still pronounced "pawmaDEE" (with a half stress on "paw" and full stress on "dee"), exactly as it would have been stressed in Gaelic.

Shipbuilding

The Glasgow firm of Alley & MacLellan was a significant producer of smaller commercial vessels as well as the world's leading manufacturer of steam lorries (later Sentinel Waggon Works of Shrewsbury). Their , designed by Archibald Leitch, is Category A listed due to its significance as the first steel-reinforced concrete building in Scotland, but was unoccupied and dilapidated as of the 2020s.

The yard had been built a considerable distance to the south of the river, with the final approach into Glasgow Central Station imposing just one of many barriers between it and the Clyde. The company specialised in supporting the far reaches of the British Empire by constructing vessels that were dismantled into kit form once they had been completed. The resulting set of parts was frequently enormous and a logistical nightmare to transport; re-assembly also depended heavily upon the availability of skilled hands at the customer's premises. As in the case of the SS Chauncy Maples, this was frequently the only viable option when the ultimate destination was very far inland.

Sources on-line

References

External links

Areas of Glasgow
Industry in Scotland
Business parks of Scotland
Industrial parks in the United Kingdom
Govanhill and Crosshill